Big Game or The Big Game may refer to:

Sports 
 Big Game (American football), the annual American football game between Stanford University and the University of California, Berkeley
 James Worthy, also known as "Big Game" James, basketball player
 "The Big Game", a common nickname for the National Football League's Super Bowl for those who cannot legally use the name
 Big Game (poker), the most famous high-stakes mixed-game poker table in Las Vegas, hosted in "Bobby's Room" at the Bellagio
 The Big Game (rugby), an annual rugby union match hosted by Harlequin F.C.
 Big Game (horse), a British thoroughbred racehorse.

Animal related 
 Game (hunting), animals hunted for food and/or sport
 Big game hunting, a form of recreational hunting
 Big-game fishing, a form of recreational fishing

Entertainment 
 The Big Game, now Mega Millions, a U.S. multi-jurisdictional lottery game
 Big Game (album), the third album by the heavy metal band White Lion
 Big Game TV, a live phone-in quiz channel
 Big Game, a 1921 film, American silent melodrama, directed by Dallas M. Fitzgerald
 The Big Game (1936 film), a 1936 sports drama film
 The Big Game (1972 film), a 1972 film directed by Robert Day
 Big Game (2014 film), a 2014 film starring Samuel L. Jackson
 The Big Game (American game show), which aired only in 1958
 The Big Game (Australian game show)
 PokerStars Big Game, a televised poker show which began airing in 2010
 Big Game (short story), a short story by Isaac Asimov
 Big Game, a mystery novel by Stuart Gibbs

See also 
 The Great Game (disambiguation)

ru:Большая игра (значения)